Milton Aaron Céliz (born 25 July 1992) is an Argentine professional footballer who plays as a forward for Almirante Brown.

Career
Céliz began his career with Arsenal de Sarandí. He appeared for his debut in September 2012 against River Plate, as the club conceded four unanswered goals away from home in the Argentine Primera División. He made fifteen appearances in the 2012–13 season, as well as netting his first goal on 11 March 2013 versus Lanús. Céliz didn't feature in the first part of 2013–14, subsequently leaving on loan to Gimnasia y Esgrima in 2014. Two goals in twenty-one followed in Primera B Nacional. A return to Arsenal followed for the upcoming 2014 campaign, as he played twelve times under Martín Palermo.

Gimnasia y Esgrima resigned him in 2015. He scored eight times back on loan with them. Céliz went back to Arsenal for seven months prior to rejoining Gimnasia y Esgrima for a third time - this time on a permanent contract. His third stint lasted the 2016–17 Primera B Nacional, as he took his total tally for the club to ninety-two matches and fourteen goals. Peruvian Primera División side Juan Aurich signed Céliz in August 2017. He netted on his debut versus Cantolao, on the way to relegation to tier two. Céliz went back to Argentina in the succeeding January, agreeing a deal with Independiente Rivadavia.

On 24 July 2018, Céliz joined Primera B Metropolitana's All Boys. His bow came in a 1–2 win away to Fénix.

Following spell at Tigre and San Martín de Tucumán, Céliz moved to Primera Nacional club Almirante Brown in May 2022.

Career statistics
.

Honours
Arsenal de Sarandí
Supercopa Argentina: 2012

References

External links

1992 births
Living people
People from La Matanza Partido
Argentine footballers
Association football forwards
Argentine expatriate footballers
Expatriate footballers in Peru
Expatriate footballers in Chile
Argentine expatriate sportspeople in Peru
Argentine expatriate sportspeople in Chile
Argentine Primera División players
Primera Nacional players
Peruvian Primera División players
Primera B Metropolitana players
Primera B de Chile players
Arsenal de Sarandí footballers
Gimnasia y Esgrima de Jujuy footballers
Juan Aurich footballers
Independiente Rivadavia footballers
All Boys footballers
San Luis de Quillota footballers
Club Atlético Tigre footballers
San Martín de Tucumán footballers
Club Almirante Brown footballers
Sportspeople from Buenos Aires Province